Rebecca Jones is Head of Archaeology and World Heritage at Historic Environment Scotland.

Career 
Jones studied for an undergraduate degree in Ancient History and Archaeology at the University of Newcastle. In 1999-2000 she worked at Aberystwyth University with Jeffrey Davies, which resulted in the publication of the volume Roman Camps in Wales and the Marches in 2006. Jones completed her PhD at the University of Glasgow in 2006 entitled "The temporary encampments of the Roman army in Scotland ", supervised by Bill Hanson. Prior to her role at Historic Environment Scotland, Jones worked for the Royal Commission on the Ancient and Historical Monuments of Scotland. Jones is co-Chair of the International Congress of Roman Frontier Studies. She published a major monograph entitled Roman Camps in Scotland in 2011. Her 2012 book Roman Camps in Britain won the Current Archaeology Book of the Year award 2013.

Selected publications 

 Davies, J., and Jones, R. 2006. Roman Camps in Wales and the Marches. University of Wales Press.
 Jones, R.H. 2011. Roman Camps in Scotland. Edinburgh: Society of Antiquaries of Scotland.
 Jones, R.H. 2012. Roman Camps in Britain. Stroud: Amberley Pub.
Owen, K. and Jones, R. 2019 Presenting an Archaeology for Everyone: Changing our approach to publicly funded archaeological investigation in Scotland, Internet Archaeology 51. https://doi.org/10.11141/ia.51.3

References 

British archaeologists
British women archaeologists
Classical archaeologists
Alumni of Newcastle University
Alumni of the University of Glasgow
Year of birth missing (living people)
Living people